This is the complete list of Asian Games medalists in ten-pin bowling from 1978 to 2018.

Men

Singles

Doubles

Trios

Team
 Team of 5: 1978–2014
 Team of 6: 2018

All-events

Masters

Women

Singles

Doubles

Trios

Team
 Team of 5: 1978–2014
 Team of 6: 2018

All-events

Masters

References

 Past Winners Asian Games – Bowling

External links
Medalists from previous Asian Games – Men – Individual
Medalists from previous Asian Games – Men – Team
Medalists from previous Asian Games – Women – Individual
Medalists from previous Asian Games – Women – Team

Bowling
medalists

Asian